Taylor Wily (born Teila Tuli, June 14, 1968) is an American actor, former sumo wrestler and mixed martial artist. He is from Laie, Hawaii and is of American Samoan descent. He is commonly known for his recurring role as Kamekona Tupuola on Hawaii Five-0.

Sumo career
In March 1987, Wily was recruited by former sekiwake Takamiyama Daigorō, another Hawaiian, and joined Azumazeki stable, which Takamiyama had founded the previous year. He was given the shikona (sumo name) of Takamikuni. He was unbeaten in his first 14 official bouts, winning two consecutive yūshō or tournament championships. In March 1988, he was promoted to the third highest makushita division, and became the first foreign born wrestler to ever win the championship in that division. In the same month, future yokozuna Akebono Tarō, also from Hawaii, joined Azumazeki stable. As the highest ranking wrestler in the stable, he was a mentor to Akebono and gave him advice on how to adjust to life in Japan. In March 1989, Takamikuni reached his highest ever rank of makushita 2, and even fought two bouts with elite jūryō ranked wrestlers (one of whom, Tōryū Kenji, was a former sekiwake). Takamikuni was never to reach sekitori status himself. He did not compete in the following tournament, and retired from sumo in July 1989 due to knee problems.

Sumo career record

Ultimate Fighting Championship
After leaving sumo, Wily went to New Japan Pro Wrestling in September 1990 and joined Tatsumi Fujinami's stable, Dragon Bombers, as a trainee, alongside fellow former sumo Nankairyū Tarō. However, the stable dissolved in 1992 and he left NJPW. He continued his training, which evolved into mixed martial arts, preparing him for the first-ever Ultimate Fighting Championships.

He competed as Teila Tuli in the first bout of the UFC 1 in November 1993, facing savate expert Gerard Gordeau. Tuli rushed forward, but lost his balance and was met with a brutal kick to the head that knocked a few of his teeth out, and a punch that broke Gordeau's hand, with the referee stopping the fight as a TKO win for Gordeau. This was  Tuli's only MMA fight. The match has been described as one of the top five David and Goliath match-ups in MMA history.

Mixed martial arts record 

|-
|Loss
|align=center|0–1
| Gerard Gordeau
| TKO (head kick) 
| UFC 1
| 
|align=center|1
|align=center|0:26
|Denver, United States
|

Acting career
Credited as Taylor Wily, he had a role in the comedy film Forgetting Sarah Marshall as a hotel worker who befriended the main character played by Jason Segel. He also has a recurring role on the television series Hawaii Five-0.
Wily made a cameo on the 20th edition of The Amazing Race, and handed out clues to racing contestants.
He also appeared as an extra in Magnum, P.I.s 1982 episode titled "The Eighth Part of the Village" in a street scene near a pool hall.

He also appeared as a sumo wrestler in "Battle of the Titans", an episode of One West Waikiki, another TV show filmed in Hawaii starring Cheryl Ladd. In that series, he had hair, unlike his character in Hawaii Five-0, wrapped in the sumo style.

Select filmography

See also

 Glossary of sumo terms
 List of past sumo wrestlers

References

External links
 
 
 
 

1969 births
Living people
Male actors from Honolulu
American male film actors
American male television actors
American male mixed martial artists
Mixed martial artists from Hawaii
American sumo wrestlers
Actors of Samoan descent
Sportspeople from Honolulu
Ultimate Fighting Championship male fighters
Mixed martial artists utilizing Sumo